James Gregor may refer to:

 A. James Gregor (1929–2019), American historian
 James Gregor Mackenzie (1927–1992), British Labour Party politician
 James Wyllie Gregor (1900–1980), Scottish botanist
 James Gregor (writer), Canadian writer

See also
 James Grigor (1811–1848), botanist